Abu Ibrahim Ahmad ibn Muhammad was the sixth Aghlabid emir of Ifriqiya, ruling from 856 to his death on 28 December 863. He succeeded his uncle, Muhammad I, and was succeeded by his brother, Ziyadat Allah II ibn Muhammad. His reign was peaceful, and mostly remembered for his public works.

References

Sources
 

863 deaths
Aghlabid emirs of Ifriqiya